

People
Amelita Galli-Curci (1882-1963), Italian soprano
Amelita Ramos (1927), wife of Fidel V. Ramos, the twelfth President of the Philippines
Amelita Ward (1923–1987), American film actress
Amelita Baltar (born 1940), Argentine singer

Music
Amelita (Court Yard Hounds album)